The Walk-In is a five-part 2022 British true crime television series dramatising the infiltration of far-right terrorist group National Action, foiling a plot to murder an MP. It stars Stephen Graham.

Synopsis 
The series is based on the true story of how Matthew Collins of activist group Hope not Hate infiltrated British neo-nazi terrorist group National Action, foiling a plot to assassinate Labour MP Rosie Cooper. 

Jack Renshaw was convicted and sentenced to life imprisonment for his plan to kill Cooper.

Production 
The series, made by ITV, was written by Jeff Pope and directed by Paul Andrew Williams.

Cast 
 Stephen Graham as Matthew Collins
Andrew Ellis as Robbie Mullen, the informant
 Dean-Charles Chapman as Jack Renshaw

Release 
The Walk-In aired on ITV from 3 October 2022. 

The documentary Nazi Hunters: The Real Walk-In was broadcast after the final episode.

Critical reception 
The Walk In was well received in the press with The Guardian, The Independent, and the Evening Standard all giving it four stars out of five. Lucy Mangan, writing in The Guardian, described it as “one of the best TV investments you can make”.

Cooper was critical of the marketing of the show, saying that she felt that she had been used as a "marketing tool" by Hope Not Hate and ITV.

References

External links
IMDB profile
ITV Hub

2022 British television series debuts
2022 British television series endings
Television series by ITV Studios
English-language television shows
Murder in television
2020s British drama television series
2020s British crime television series
2020s British television miniseries
British crime drama television series
ITV television dramas